Georg Philipp Telemann's 12 fantaisies à traversière sans basse, 12 Fantasias for Solo Flute, TWV 40:2–13, were published in Hamburg in 1732–33. An extant copy of the publication, conserved in Brussels, has a spurious title page reading Fantasie per il Violino senza Basso (Fantasias for Solo Violin).

Telemann's solo flute fantasias are alone in the Baroque repertoire to include movements seemingly impossible on flute: fugues (fantasias 2, 6, and 8–11), a French overture (fantasia 7) and a passacaglia (fantasia 5). In 2012, an arrangement for viola solo was published by Euprint. In this arrangement, through the use of double stops, some many-voiced parts appear as real polyphonic pieces.

Structure
This work comprises the following:
Fantasia in A major (Vivace – Allegro)
Fantasia in A minor (Grave – Vivace – Adagio – Allegro)
Fantasia in B minor (Largo – Vivace – Largo – Vivace – Allegro)
Fantasia in B-flat major (Andante – Allegro – Presto)
Fantasia in C major (Presto – Largo – Presto – Dolce – Allegro – Allegro)
Fantasia in D minor (Dolce – Allegro – Spirituoso)
Fantasia in D major (Alla francese – Presto)
Fantasia in E minor (Largo – Spirituoso – Allegro)
Fantasia in E major (Affettuoso – Allegro – Grave – Vivace)
Fantasia in F-sharp minor (A Tempo giusto – Presto – Moderato)
Fantasia in G major (Allegro – Adagio – Vivace – Allegro)
Fantasia in G minor (Grave – Allegro – Grave – Allegro – Dolce – Allegro – Presto)

The collection is arranged by key, progressing more or less stepwise from A major to G minor. Telemann deliberately avoided keys that are impractical on the one-key flute, i.e. B major, C minor, F minor and F-sharp major. There are two ways to view the overall structure of the collection: one way, in which the work is divided into two parts, is suggested by the fact that Fantasia 7 begins with a French overture, indicating a start of a new section. This device was also later used by Johann Sebastian Bach in Variation 16 of his Goldberg Variations. Another was proposed by scholar Wolfgang Hirschmann: there are four modal groups of three fantasias: major-minor-minor, major-major-minor, major-minor-major, and minor-major-minor.

References
Notes

Sources

External links
 contains scores including the original edition, and performances.

Fantasia
Solo flute pieces
Telemann